Paul French (born 27 August 1966) is a British author. In addition to articles about a range of subjects, he has specialised in books about modern Chinese history and contemporary Chinese society, including Midnight in Peking.

Biography
French was born in the London Borough of Enfield. He attended Raglan Junior School and Edmonton County School, North London. He gained an M.Phil from the University of Glasgow and studied Chinese at the City Literary Institute. After university French worked briefly for Time Out magazine and Euromonitor in London before relocating to Shanghai. There he co-founded the independent research firm Access Asia. It specialises in analysing Chinese consumer and retail markets. In September 2011 Access Asia was acquired by the London-based market research company Mintel. French is now a full-time author based in London.

Journalism and publishing
French was columnist for the China Economic Quarterly and the China Economic Review as well as being a columnist for and the China Editor of Ethical Corporation magazine. French has contributed to Foreign Policy, The Washington Post, South China Morning Post, Shanghai Daily, The Guardian, The Cleaver Quarterly and The Diplomat.

French is a contributor to the UK's Real Crime magazine.

As a book reviewer, French has contributed to the (British) Literary Review, The Washington Post, The Asian Review of Books, and the Los Angeles Review of Books. He is the author of the fortnightly "Crime and the City" column for Literary Hub. French has also made literary contributions to the Asia Literary Review and Cha: An Asian Literary Journal.

He is also a former board member of the Shanghai Foreign Correspondents Club and a member of the Korea Research Hub (KRH) based within Leeds and Sheffield universities. French was also a member of the editorial advisory board for Anthem Press's ‘China in the Twenty First Century’ series and the Honorary Research and Publications Director for the Royal Asiatic Society of Great Britain and Ireland – China Branch. In 2011 French launched the Asian Arguments series of books for Zed Booksacting as the Series Editor.

French is also the author of the blog China Rhyming: A gallimaufry of random China history and research interests.

Works

As solo author

Works by French alone
North Korea The Paranoid Peninsula: A Modern History (Zed Books, 2005, updated edition, 2007)
Carl Crow: A Tough Old China Hand – The Life, Times and Adventures of an American in Shanghai (Hong Kong University Press, 2006) Life and times of Crow. 
Through the Looking Glass: China Foreign Journalists From Opium War to Mao (Hong Kong University Press, 2009)
The Old Shanghai A-Z (Hong Kong University Press, 2010)
Midnight in Peking: How the Murder of a Young Englishwoman Haunted the Last Days of Old China (Beijing: Viking, 2011; London: Viking, 2012; New York: Penguin Books, Rev., 2012). .
The Badlands: Decadent Playground of Old Peking (Asia and Australia: Penguin Specials, 2012; London, New York: Penguin Specials, 2013)
North Korea: State of Paranoia (London: Zed Books, 2014).  .
City of Devils: The Two Men Who Ruled the Underworld of Old Shanghai (London: riverrun, 2018; New York: Picador, 2018). .

Co-authored works
One Billion Shoppers: Accessing Asia's Consuming Passions After the Meltdown (Nicholas Brealey Publishing, 1998) – with Matthew Crabbe
Oil on Water: Tankers, Pirates and the Rise of China (Zed Books, 2010) – with Sam Chambers
Fat China: How Expanding Waistlines are Changing a Nation (Anthem Press, 2010) – with Matthew Crabbe

References 

"Paul French". Melbourne Writers Festival.
"Paul French". Penguin Books Australia.
"Paul French, author of Midnight in Peking, answers Ten Terrifying Questions". Booktopia Blog. 11 August 2011.

External links 
 Midnight in Peking website
 China Rhyming
 Jonathan Spence, "Who Killed Pamela in Peking?" (Review of Midnight in Peking), New York Review of Books 21 March 2013.

1966 births
Alumni of the University of Glasgow
British historians
Living people
People from the London Borough of Enfield